Frederick Amos Heimach (January 27, 1901 – June 1, 1973) born in Camden, New Jersey, was a Major League Baseball pitcher for the Philadelphia Athletics (1920–26), Boston Red Sox (1926), New York Yankees (1928–29) and Brooklyn Robins/Brooklyn Dodgers (1930–33). He helped the Yankees win the 1928 World Series.

In 13 seasons, he had a 62–69 win–loss record, 296 games, 127 games started, 56 complete games, 5 shutouts, 104 games finished, 7 saves, 1,288⅔ innings pitched, 1,510 hits allowed, 755 runs allowed, 639 earned runs allowed, 64 home runs allowed, 360 walks allowed, 334 strikeouts, 27 hit batsmen, 14 wild pitches, 5,674 batters faced, 4 balks and a 4.46 ERA.

He was a very good hitting pitcher. He compiled a .236 batting average (128-for-542) with 58 runs, 3 home runs and 50 RBIs. As a member of the Philadelphia A's, in 1923 he batted .254 (30-for-118) with 11 RBI, he also played 6 games at first base and batted .322 in 1924 (29-for-90) with 12 RBI.

He recorded a .972 fielding percentage in his 13 year major league career. After committing 2 errors in the third inning on September 22, 1926 pitching for the A's against the Cleveland Indians at League Park, he went the next 134 appearances and handling 172 total chances (24 putouts, 148 assists) to the end of his career in 1933 without another miscue.

He died in Fort Myers, Florida at the age of 72.

Sources

1901 births
1973 deaths
Major League Baseball pitchers
Baseball players from Camden, New Jersey
Philadelphia Athletics players
Boston Red Sox players
New York Yankees players
Brooklyn Dodgers players
Brooklyn Robins players
Raleigh Nats players
Moline Plowboys players
St. Paul Saints (AA) players
Toledo Mud Hens players